Reel 'N' Roll is a Rawlins Cross album. It is the band's third album, released in April 1993 by Ground Swell.

Composition
Tracks 9, 10, 11, and 12 are re-recordings, previously recorded on the band's debut album A Turn of the Wheel.

Track listing
All songs written by Dave Panting, unless otherwise noted.

"Reel 'N' Roll" – 4:59 
"Don't You Be the One" – 3:48 
"It'll Have to Wait" (Geoff Panting) – 3:15 
"Long Night" – 5:13 
"Wedding Gift" – 4:00 
"Pedestrian Again" (G. Panting) – 2:48 
"Mystery Tonight" (G. Panting) – 4:40 
"Dance Hall" – 3:07 
"Ghost of Love" – 3:32 
"Turn of the Wheel" (G. Panting) – 2:39 
"Colleen" – 3:53 
"MacPherson's Lament" (Traditional) – 3:56

Personnel

Rawlins Cross

Dave Panting - guitars, mandolin, bouzouki, tenor banjo, backing vocals
Geoff Panting - piano accordion with midi interface, backing vocals
Ian McKinnon - highland bagpipe, tin whistle, trumpet, bodhran
Brian Bourne - bass, chapman stick, backing vocals
Howie Southwind - drums
Joey Kitson - lead and backing vocals, harmonica

Guest Musicians
Chris Mitchell - saxophone on track 3
Tom Roach - percussion
Catherine McKinnon - fiddle on track 12
Allen MacKenzie, John MacLean, and Jack Maclean - highland bagpipes on track 12

Production
Hayward Parrott - producer, mixing engineer
Michael Nichols - second engineer
Doug Aucoin - digital imaging and design
Kevin Sallows and Bruce Kierstead - logo design

References

1993 albums
Rawlins Cross albums